The Turkish Open  is a darts tournament that has been held since 2007.

List of winners

Men's

Women's

Boys

Tournament records
 Most wins 3:  Martin Phillips. 
 Most Finals 5:  Martin Phillips. 
 Most Semi Finals 5:  Martin Phillips. 
 Most Quarter Finals 5:  Martin Phillips. 
 Most Appearances 8:  Martin Phillips. 
 Most Prize Money won £6,933:  Martin Phillips.
 Best winning average (100.20) :  Martin Phillips v  Danny Noppert, 2015, Semi Final.
 Youngest Winner age 25:   Willem Mandigers. 
 Oldest Winner age 55:  Martin Phillips.
 Worst Odds Winner age 45:  Michael Gore

References

External links
Turkish Bocce Bowling Dart Federation (TBBDF).

2007 establishments in Turkey
Darts tournaments